The Hole In The Wall Golf Club is an 18-hole private golf facility in Naples, Florida.

Course

The course was originally designed in 1957 by Dick Wilson, the well-known golf course architect.
It opened in January 1958.

The course was renovated in 2009 and the number of bunkers was increased to 109.  The material removed to dig the lake was used to "build up" the entire course to improve grass and course maintenance.  The new longer course measures 6565 yards, has a course rating of 71.8 and a slope of 130.  The regular course is 6230 yards, has a course rating of 70.0 and a slope of 128.

Conservation

The shorelines have been landscaped with aquatic plantings to reduce erosion and provide habitat.
Animal life includes gray fox, bobcat and cypress fox squirrel. The University of Florida uses it as a research site for the cypress fox squirrel.
Birdlife includes snowy egrets and great egrets, wood storks, tricolored herons, great blue herons, little blue herons, bald eagles and pileated woodpeckers.

References
Citations

Sources

Golf clubs and courses in Florida
1958 establishments in Florida
Buildings and structures in Naples, Florida
Sports venues completed in 1958